Max Werner (born 29 December 1953 in Hilversum) is a Dutch vocalist, musician, and drummer. He was the lead singer, drummer, and percussionist of the progressive art rock band Kayak.   

In 1972, Werner co-founded the band along with keyboardist Ton Scherpenzeel, guitarist Johan Slager, and drummer Pim Koopman. He sang lead vocals (and played mellotron) on Kayak's first five albums. He later switched to drums until the band split up in 1982. In 1999, he returned as singer for the Kayak album Close to the Fire. After a short tour in 2000, he had to leave again due to health problems.  

Werner also recorded four solo albums. In May 1981, he scored a hit single with "Rain in May", which peaked at No. 6 in the Netherlands and was a huge success in certain other European countries as well. In June of that same year, the song also peaked as high as No. 74 on the American Billboard Hot 100 charts. In September 1981, the song peaked at No. 2 in Germany. In April 2005, Werner performed the song on the German TV show Die Hit-Giganten – die 30 größten Hits und Interpreten der coolen Achtziger.

Discography

Studio albums with Kayak
(as lead singer):
 See See the Sun (1973)
 Kayak II (1974)
 Royal Bed Bouncer (1975)
 The Last Encore (1976)
 Starlight Dancer (1977)
 Close to the Fire (2000)

(as drummer):
 Phantom of the Night (1979)
 Periscope Life (1980)
 Merlin (1981)
 Eyewitness (1981) ("Live" studio album)

Solo albums

 Rainbow's End (1979)
 Seasons (1981)
 How Can It Be... Like This? (1988)
 Not the Opera (1995)

Singles
 "Rain in May" (1981)
 "Summer in the City" (1981)

References

Sources
Line-up page on the Kayak official website

1953 births
Living people
Dutch rock singers
People from Hilversum
Dutch rock drummers
Male drummers
Kayak (band) members